Zé Mário may refer to:

Zé Mário (footballer, born 1949), Brazilian football manager
Zé Mário (footballer, born 1992), Brazilian footballer